The men's 400 metres hurdles at the 2018 Commonwealth Games, as part of the athletics programme, took place in the Carrara Stadium on 10 and 12 April 2018.

Kyron McMaster won the first ever Commonwealth Games gold medal for the British Virgin Islands. His victory followed severe disruption of his life, as his coach Xavier Samuels had died the previous year during Hurricane Irma.

Records
Prior to this competition, the existing world and Games records were as follows:

Schedule
The schedule was as follows:

All times are Australian Eastern Standard Time (UTC+10)

Results

First round
The first round consisted of three heats. The two fastest competitors per heat (plus two fastest losers) advanced to the final.

Heat 1

Heat 2

Heat 3

Final
The medals were determined in the final.

References

Men's 400 metres hurdles
2018